Raudoja Reservoir is located on Raudoja River in Raudoja Village, Anija Parish, Harju County, Estonia near Kehra.

The reservoir is part of Tallinn water supply system and is connected to Jägala, Pirita rivers via canals. The water that keeps flowing in Raudoja river past the reservoir ends up in Soodla river.

History 
The construction of the reservoir took place in 1981.

See also 
 Soodla Reservoir
 Aavoja Reservoir
 Kaunissaare Reservoir
 Paunküla Reservoir
 Vaskjala Reservoir
 Lake Ülemiste
 List of lakes of Estonia

References

Anija Parish
Reservoirs in Estonia
Lakes of Harju County